The EU's Chemicals Strategy for Sustainability Towards a Toxic-Free Environment is a strategy published in 2020 that is part of the EU's zero pollution ambition, a key commitment of the European Green Deal.

See also
Registration, Evaluation, Authorisation and Restriction of Chemicals

References

External links
https://ec.europa.eu/environment/strategy/chemicals-strategy_en

European Union
European Green Deal
Environmental policy in the EU
Chemical safety